Labrys portucalensis is a Gram-negative, rod-shaped, non-motile, non-spore-forming and aerobic bacteria from the family Xanthobacteraceae which has been isolated from polluted soil in Estarreja in Portugal. Labrys portucalensis has the ability to degrade fluorobenzene.

References

Further reading

External links
Type strain of Labrys portucalensis at BacDive -  the Bacterial Diversity Metadatabase

Hyphomicrobiales
Bacteria described in 2008